Dhhai Kilo Prem is an Indian Hindi television series, which began airing from 3 April 2017 on Star Plus. The series is being produced by Balaji Telefilms of Ekta Kapoor and Shobha Kapoor. The series aired from Mondays - Saturdays during the Star Dopahar (afternoon) programming block. The series ended on 30 September 2017 when the afternoon programming block was discontinued.

Plot 
The story follows the journey of two overweighted individuals Piyush and Dipika. Despite both getting married, Piyush dislikes Dipika. Finally after many circumstances, they fall in love.

Cast

Main cast
 Meherzan Mazda as Piyush Sharma: Dipika's husband; Pankaj and Madhuri's son
 Anjali Anand as Dipika Sharma: Piyush's Wife ; Dev and Ragini's daughter

Recurring cast
 Alice Kaushik as Meghna Rahul Mishra: Piyush's sister, Rahul's wife
 Kiran Karmarkar as Pankaj Sharma: Piyush's father
 Manasi Joshi Roy as Madhuri Sharma: Piyush's mother
 Geeta Nair as Rukmani: Dipika's Aunty, Meghna's Mother inlaw 
 Rahul Sharma as Rahul Mishra: Dipika's cousin, Meghna's husband
 Vikram Pratap as Kishor
 Rajendra Chawla as Dev Mishra : Dipika's father
 Ritu Vij as Ragini Mishra: Dipika's mother
 Himanshu Arora as Darshan Mishra : Dipika's Brother
 Aly Goni as Sushant
 Shireen Mirza as Rashmi
 Nandini Gupta as Namrata: Piyush's sister
 Udit Shukla as Inspector Kunal: Namrata's husband
 Pravisht Mishra as Tushar: Piyush's brother
 Benazir Shaikh as Sarika: Dipika's Best Friend
 Suraj Kakkar as Rishi: Sarika's lover
 Rohan Gandotra as Aman
 Kishwer Merchant as Shilpa

Production
Male lead Meherzan Mazda speaking about his transformation for his role from 80 to 102 kgs, he said, "I had to go through special physical training to match the body type for my character. The script demanded me to get into a very weird shape. Along with muscular training in the gym, I went on a guilt-free indulgence diet. I was on a strict diet to gain weight. I had to put on 16 kilos in two months and I am glad that I have managed to do it." Female lead Anjali Anand transformed from 72 to 108 kgs for her role. However, she was asked to gain more weight than this but she refused.

After auditioning over 900 people, Anjali Anand was cast as Deepika.

Reception
The Times of India stated, "Set in Agra, the feel of the show is quite retro. Dialogues of the show, look forced and deliberate, only meant to create an effect. Focusing solely on how obesity comes as a hurdle in the way of finding a match, the content focuses on a single issue, and does not deal fairly with all the problems related to obesity. Even though Anjali and Meherzan do justice to their roles, it is the weak plot that kills the tale."

References

External links
 Dhhai Kilo Prem Streaming On Hotstar

Balaji Telefilms television series
2017 Indian television series debuts
Hindi-language television shows
Indian television soap operas
Indian drama television series
Television shows set in Mumbai
StarPlus original programming
Television shows set in Uttar Pradesh
2017 Indian television series endings